Dharmanatha was the fifteenth Jain Tirthankara of the present age (Avasarpini). According to Jain beliefs, he became a siddha, a liberated soul which has destroyed all of its karma. Dharmanath was born to King Bhanu Raja and Queen Suvrata Rani at Ratnapuri in the Ikshvaku dynasty. His birth date was the third day of the Magh Sukla month of the Indian calendar.

Hutheesing Jain Temple, located at Ahmedabad in Gujarat, constructed in 1848 AD, is dedicated to him.

Biography
Dharmanatha was the fifteenth Tirthankara of the present age (Avasarpini) of Jainism. According to Jain beliefs, he became a siddha, a liberated soul which has destroyed all of its karma.

His birth date was the 3rd day of the Magh Sukla month of the Indian calendar. He attained Moksha at Shikharji.

Famous Temple
 Hutheesing Jain Temple: best known Jain temple in Ahmedabad in Gujarat, India. It was constructed in 1848.
 Dharmanath Jains Temple at Mattancherry, Kochi, Kerala

Gallery

See also

God in Jainism
Arihant (Jainism)
Jainism and non-creationism

References

Sources

External links

Tirthankaras